Scinax perereca is a species of frog in the family Hylidae.
It is found in Brazil, Argentina, and Paraguay.
Its natural habitats are subtropical or tropical moist lowland forests, freshwater marshes, intermittent freshwater marshes, heavily degraded former forest, ponds, and canals and ditches.
It is threatened by habitat loss.

References

perereca
Amphibians described in 1995
Taxonomy articles created by Polbot